Kamenný Újezd is a municipality and village in České Budějovice District in the South Bohemian Region of the Czech Republic. It has about 2,500 inhabitants.

Administrative parts
Villages of Březí, Bukovec, Kosov, Krasejovka, Milíkovice, Opalice, Radostice and Rančice are administrative parts of Kamenný Újezd.

Twin towns – sister cities

Kamenný Újezd is twinned with:
 Krauchthal, Switzerland

References

External links

Villages in České Budějovice District